Amorebieta-Etxano, also known as Zornotza (Spanish, Amorebieta-Echano), is a town and municipality located in Biscay in the Basque Country, an Autonomous Community in northern Spain.

At the time of the 2019 census, the population of the municipality was 19,339, with 16,907 inhabitants living in Amorebieta. The mayor is Andoni Agirrebeitia.

Geography

Amorebieta-Etxano is an inland town in the comarca of Duranguesado in the province of Biscay in northern Spain. It is located in the valley of the River Ibaizabal; this river joins the River Nervión a few kilometres to the north, after which it is sometimes called the "Nervión-Ibaizabal" because the two rivers are very similar in size. Amorebieta-Etxano is situated among rugged mountains and has a rich historical heritage.

History
The municipality of Amorebieta-Etxano came into being on 26 January 1951 as the result of a merger between Amorebieta and Etxano, two communities in the historic administrative district of Merindad de Zornotza. The other parts of the district were merged into the neighbouring municipality of Muxika. The new coat of arms shows the union between Amorebieta and Etxano. In the 2014 census, Amorebieta had a population of 16,907 while that of Etxano was 221.

The town

The town is divided into several districts. The church of Santa María de la Asunción is in the centre of Amorebieta on the banks of the Ibaizaba. It is a large Renaissance building started in 1555 and opened for worship in 1608 and is noted for its altarpiece. Another Renaissance church is the Parroquia de San Juan Bautista de Larrea. This dates back to 1647, and in 1704 it was given to the Carmelite Order to found a convent. In San Antonio is the hermitage of San Miguel de Dudea, and nearby is the Neoclassical López Palace.

A branch of the international company Tecnalia Research & Innovation is located here in the Parque Empresarial Boroa where the firm employs 1500 people.

Notable people
 Jon Aurtenetxe, footballer 
 Xabier Etxeita, footballer
 Beñat Intxausti, cyclist
José Ignacio López de Arriortúa, manager
 Jon Morcillo, footballer

References

External links
 Amorebieta Etxano, Official web page
 Amorebieta-Etxano in the Bernardo Estornés Lasa – Auñamendi Encyclopedia (Euskomedia Fundazioa) 

Municipalities in Biscay